Jack Alfred Evans (born 11 October 1930) was an Australian rules footballer who played with St Kilda in the Victorian Football League (VFL).

Notes

External links 

 

1930 births
Living people
Australian rules footballers from Victoria (Australia)
St Kilda Football Club players